Mirror Mirror is the first extended play and third major release by American hip hop duo Twiztid. It was released on April 9, 2002 through Psychopathic Records. Production was handled by Fritz "The Cat" Vankosky and both Twiztid members. It features guest appearances from Blaze Ya Dead Homie and Violent J.

Reception

The album peaked at #103 on the Billboard 200 and at #5 on the Independent Albums in the United States.

AllMusic writer Bradley Torreano wrote that "Songs like 'CNT' are teenage anthems that actually have more than a passing similarity" to Detroit rapper Eminem, and "despite the fact that few outside the juggalo community will give this a chance, this might be one of the most accurate portrayals of the mood of most unhappy young people in 2002".

Track listing

Personnel
Jamie "Madrox" Spaniolo – vocals (tracks: 1-6, 8-11), producer, mixing & recording
Paul "Monoxide" Methric – vocals, producer, mixing & recording
Chris Rouleau – vocals (track 4)
Joseph Bruce – vocals (track 7)
Fritz Vankosky – producer

Charts

References

External links

2002 EPs
Twiztid albums
Psychopathic Records EPs